Aslanbek Zikreev (born 15 September 1995) is a Russian kickboxer. He is currently signed to the ONE Championship organization.

Combat Press ranked him as the #8 Super Flyweight in the world between December 2020 and July 2021.

Fighting career

ONE Championship
Zikreev made his professional debut against Wang Junguang at ONE Championship: Inside the Matrix 4 on November 20, 2020. He won the bout by split decision, after a closely contested fight.

Zikreev is scheduled to face Asahi Shinagawa at ONE Championship: Lights Out on March 11, 2022. Zikreev was unable to compete due to sanctions from the Singaporean government against Russia.

Zikreev faced Zhang Peimian at ONE 159 on July 22, 2022. He lost the fight by unanimous decision.

Titles
Amateur
World Games
 2017 World Games Muay Thai -54kg 

International Federation of Muaythai Associations
 2016 IFMA World Cup in Kazan -54kg  
 2016 IFMA World Championships -54kg 
 2017 IFMA World Championships -54kg 
 2018 IFMA European Championships -54kg 
 2018 FISU World University Championship -54kg 
 2019 IFMA European Championships -54kg 
 2021 IFMA World Championships -54kg

Fight record 

|- style="background:#cfc;"
| 2022-11-26 || Win ||align=left| Turach Novruzov || RCC Fair Fight 19 || Yekaterinburg, Russia || Decision (Unanimous) || 3  || 3:00
|-
|-  style="background:#fbb;"
| 2022-07-22 || Loss ||align=left| Zhang Peimian || ONE 159 || Kallang, Singapore || Decision (unanimous) || 3 ||3:00 
|-
|- style="background:#cfc;"
| 2022-02-05 || Win ||align=left| Nichoa || Muaythai Factory || Kemerovo, Russia || Decision (unanimous) || 3 ||3:00 
|- style="background:#cfc;"
| 2021-10-21 || Win ||align=left| Abdul Buranov || Muaythai Factory || Kemerovo, Russia || KO (spinning back elbow) || 1 ||4:45 
|-  style="background:#cfc;"
| 2020-11-20 || Win ||align=left| Wang Junguang || ONE Championship: Inside the Matrix 4 || Kallang, Singapore || Decision (split) || 3 ||3:00 
|-
| colspan=9 | Legend:    

|-  style="background:#cfc;"
| 2021-12-11 ||Win ||align=left| Matee Thueanthet || 2021 IFMA World Championships, Final || Bangkok, Thailand || Decision (29:28)|| 3 ||3:00
|-
! style=background:white colspan=9 |
|-  style="background:#cfc;"
| 2021-12-10 || Win ||align=left| Shamil Yermagambetov || 2021 IFMA World Championships, Semi Finals || Bangkok, Thailand || Decision (30:27) || 3 ||3:00
|-  style="background:#cfc;"
| 2021-12-08 || Win ||align=left| Kevin Martínez Bravo || 2021 IFMA World Championships, Quarter Finals || Bangkok, Thailand || RSCO || 3 ||
|-  style="background:#cfc;"
| 2021-12-06 || Win ||align=left| Abdullah Ertas || 2021 IFMA World Championships, Round 1 || Bangkok, Thailand || Decision (30:25)|| 3 ||3:00

|-  style="background:#cfc;"
| 2019-11-10|| Win ||align=left| Sagif Gasanov || 2019 IFMA European Championships, Final || Minsk, Belarus || Decision (30:27)|| 3 || 3:00
|-
! style=background:white colspan=9 |
|-  style="background:#cfc;"
| 2019-11-08|| Win ||align=left| Kevin Martinez Bravo || 2019 IFMA European Championships, Semi Final || Minsk, Belarus || Decision (30:25)|| 3 || 3:00
|-  style="background:#cfc;"
| 2019-11-05|| Win ||align=left| Cafer Gok || 2019 IFMA European Championships, Quarter Final || Minsk, Belarus || Decision || 3 || 3:00

|-  bgcolor="#fbb"
| 2018-07-28|| Loss ||align=left| Elaman Sayassatov || 2018 IFMA-FISU University World Championship, Final  ||  Pattaya, Thailand || Decision (29:28)|| 3 ||3:00 
|-
! style=background:white colspan=9 |

|-  bgcolor="#cfc"
| 2018-07-26|| Win ||align=left| Pengsai Ausma|| 2018 IFMA-FISU University World Championship, Semi Final  ||  Pattaya, Thailand || Decision (29:28) || 3 ||3:00 

|-  style="background:#cfc;"
| 2018-07-07|| Win ||align=left| Kevin Martinez Bravo || 2018 IFMA European Championships, Final || Prague, Czech Republic || Decision (29:28)|| 3 || 3:00
|-
! style=background:white colspan=9 |
|-  style="background:#cfc;"
| 2018-07-04|| Win ||align=left| Andrii Mezentsev ||2018 IFMA European Championships, Semi Final || Prague, Czech Republic || Decision (30:27)|| 3 || 3:00
|-  style="background:#cfc;"
| 2018-07-01|| Win ||align=left| Sagif Gasanov || 2018 IFMA European Championships, Quarter Final || Prague, Czech Republic || Decision (30:27)|| 3 || 3:00
|-  style="background:#cfc;"
| 2017-07-30|| Win ||align=left| Deok Jae Yoon || World Games 2017, Bronze Medal Fight || Wrocław, Poland || Decision || 3 || 3:00
|-
! style=background:white colspan=9 |
|-  style="background:#fbb;"
| 2017-07-29|| Loss ||align=left| Elaman Sayassatov || World Games 2017, Semi Finals || Wrocław, Poland || Decision (30:27) || 3 || 3:00
|-  style="background:#cfc;"
| 2017-07-28|| Win ||align=left| Yu Xi Chen || World Games 2017, Quarter Finals || Wrocław, Poland || RSC-OC || 2 || 
|-  style="background:#fbb;"
| 2017-05-12|| Loss ||align=left| Sprinter Pangkongprab || 2017 IFMA World Championships, Final || Minsk, Belarus || Decision (30:27)|| 3 || 3:00
|-
! style=background:white colspan=9 |
|-  style="background:#cfc;"
| 2017-05-10|| Win ||align=left| Mikalai Sviadomski || 2017 IFMA World Championships, Semi Final || Minsk, Belarus || Decision (29:28) || 3 || 3:00
|-  style="background:#cfc;"
| 2017-05-08|| Win ||align=left| Issam Bougadir || 2017 IFMA World Championships, Quarter Final || Minsk, Belarus || Decision (29:28) || 3 || 3:00
|-  style="background:#cfc;"
| 2016-11-26|| Win ||align=left| Clément Adrover|| IFMA World Cup 2016 in Kazan, Final || Kazan, Russia || Decision || 3 ||
|-
! style=background:white colspan=9 |
|-  style="background:#cfc;"
| 2016-11-24|| Win ||align=left| Hossein Nasiriyengejeh|| IFMA World Cup 2016 in Kazan, Semi Final || Kazan, Russia || TKO || 2 ||
|-  style="background:#cfc;"
| 2016-11-22|| Win ||align=left| Kamil Dybiec || IFMA World Cup 2016 in Kazan, Quarter Final || Kazan, Russia || TKO || 2 ||
|-  style="background:#fbb;"
| 2016-05-26|| Loss ||align=left| Mussin Ilyas|| 2016 IFMA World Championships, Semi Final || Jonkoping, Sweden || Decision (29:28)|| 3 ||
|-
! style=background:white colspan=9 |
|-  style="background:#cfc;"
| 2016-05-23|| Win ||align=left| Roman Vagilevich || 2016 IFMA World Championships, Quarter Final || Jonkoping, Sweden || Decision (29:28)|| 3 ||

|-  style="background:#fbb;"
| 2015-08-|| Loss||align=left| Boubkar Ariba|| 2015 IFMA World Championships, Quarter Finals || Bangkok, Thailand || Decision || 3 ||3:00

|-  style="background:#cfc;"
| 2015-08-|| Win ||align=left| Gokhan Kara|| 2015 IFMA World Championships, 1/8 Finals || Bangkok, Thailand || Decision || 3 ||3:00
|-

|-
| colspan=9 | Legend:

See also 
List of male kickboxers

References

1994 births
Living people
Russian Muay Thai practitioners
Russian male kickboxers
Bantamweight kickboxers
ONE Championship kickboxers